Lars Jakobson Thingnæsset (1760–1829) was a Norwegian farmer and politician.

He worked as a farmer at Notenes in Førde. He was a representative to the Norwegian Parliament during the term 1815–1816, in 1818 and in 1824. He died in a drowning accident at Kinn.

References

1760 births
1829 deaths
Members of the Storting
Sogn og Fjordane politicians
Deaths by drowning in Norway
Accidental deaths in Norway